In Canadian folklore, the Manipogo is a lake monster said to live in Lake Manitoba, Manitoba, Canada. The creature was dubbed Manipogo in 1960, the name echoing British Columbia's Ogopogo. There is also a Lake Winnipegosis monster called Winnepogo, thought possibly to be the same creature since the lakes are connected. It is the namesake of the Manipogo Provincial Park.

It is described as "A long muddy-brown body with humps that show above the water, and a sheep-like head."

History
The local native population has legends of serpent-like creatures in Lake Manitoba going back hundreds of years. Sightings of the lake monster have been reported since the 1800s.

The community of St. Laurent on the southeast shore of Lake Manitoba holds a yearly Manipogo festival during the first week of March.

Searches
A group of seventeen witnesses, all reportedly strangers to each other, claimed to have spotted three Manipogos swimming together.

In the early 1960s, Professor James A. McLeod of the University of Manitoba investigated the creature by trying to locate its remains. If there is a breeding population in the lake, carcasses and bones should remain after death. McLeod found none.

Alleged sightings

1909: Hudson's Bay Company fur trader Valentine McKay reports seeing a massive creature in Cedar Lake.
1935: Timber inspector C. F. Ross and a friend saw the creature. On its head was a single horn and its head was small and flat. To them it looked very much like a dinosaur.
1948: C. P. Alric reported that some sort of creature rose  out of the lake and gave a "prehistoric type of dinosaur cry".
1957: Louis Belcher and Eddie Nipanik saw a giant serpent-like creature in the lake.
1997: Several reports by cross country campers from Quebec staying at Lundar Beach campground saw what appeared to be a large reptile head rise and fall in the water several hundred feet off shore. Swimmers were evacuated from the water; the head only appeared one time. It was dismissed as a floating log, but no log was seen afterwards.
2004: Commercial fisherman Keith Haden, originally from Newfoundland, reported several of his fishing nets on Lake Manitoba near the narrows one day to be torn up by what seemed like an ocean shark or killer whale. The fish that were in the nets were not nibbled on, but actually torn in half, by what seemed like huge bites.
2009: Several residents at Twin Lakes Beach reported seeing several humps a few hundred yards from their lake-front cottages. No photos were taken.
2011: Many sightings of several humps emerging and then submerging seen offshore at locations like Marshy Point, Scotch Bay, and Laurentia Beach by security personnel patrolling flooded cottage and home areas.

Television
Manipogo was featured on an episode of the television documentary series Northern Mysteries.

See also
 Memphre, said to live in Lake Memphremagog, Quebec
 Seelkee, said to live in the swamps of what is now Chilliwack, in British Columbia
 Turtle Lake Monster

References

External links
 Lake Manitoba Narrows website

Canadian legendary creatures
Culture of Manitoba
Canadian folklore
Water monsters